The 1932–33 Northern Football League season was the 40th in the history of the Northern Football League, a football competition in Northern England.

Clubs

The league featured 13 clubs which competed in the last season, along with one new club:
 Shildon, joined from the North Eastern League

League table

References

1932-33
4